Avianca Express (legally Regional Express Américas S.A.S.) is a Colombian regional airline founded in December 2018. It is owned by Avianca Group and is being phased in, as of spring 2019, as part of the adjustment plan for its operating model and in search of more profitability and efficiency.

History
The peculiarity of Avianca Holdings' new strategy is that flights are not routed through an airline hub, but from point-to-point. In return, Avianca gradually withdrew from regional centers and intends to serve only important national and international destinations in the future.

Flight operations were carried out exclusively with a fleet of ATR 72-600s, a twin-engine turboprop aircraft that fits with regional airports with shorter runways and a more limited aviation infrastructure. Avianca Holdings received Aerocivil's air traffic approval for the Colombian regional market in February 2018.

From March 1, 2019, the airline embarked on regional routes from Bogotá to cities such as Manizales, Florencia, Villavicencio, Yopal, Neiva, Ibagué, and Popayán; and also from Cali to Pasto and Tumaco. Since August 2019, it also flies between Bucaramanga and Cartagena.

The airline, previously known under its working title Regional Express Américas, received its final name Avianca Express in mid-February 2020.

On March 30, 2020, Avianca Express started operating at Olaya Herrera Airport in Medellín, which Avianca had not served in 20 years, with connections to Quibdó, Montería and Bucaramanga. Apart from this, a new flight plan came into force, which included improvements to connections to and from Bogotá, and also a new connection to Barrancabermeja.

Destinations
As of August 2022, the following destinations are served by Avianca Express:

Fleet

Current fleet
 the Avianca Express fleet consists of the following aircraft:

Former fleet
Avianca Express previously operated the following aircraft:

Accidents and incidents
On September 7, 2019, an ATR 72-600 (registered HK-5041) suffered a tailstrike on landing at La Nubia Airport. The aircraft landed and rolled out normally to its parking position. All 49 passengers and 5 crew members were uninjured.

See also
List of airlines of the Americas
List of airlines of Colombia
List of regional airlines

References

External links

Airlines of Colombia
Airlines established in 2018